Violet is a 1921 German silent drama film directed by Artur Holz and starring Olga Tschechowa, Hans Kuhnert and Eugen Burg. The film was based on a novel by Kurt Aram. It premiered at the cinema in the Tauentzienpalast on 11 November 1921.

Cast
 Olga Tschechowa as Violet 
 Hans Kuhnert as Herbert von Strehlen 
 Eugen Burg as Hans von Maalen 
 Adele Sandrock as Violets Mutter 
 Maria Dona as Archis Erzieherin 
 Emmi Emmering as Lore 
 Paul Gerhardt as Andreas, Gärtnerbursche 
 Willy Hendrichs as Lateska, Detektiv 
 Hedwig Karma as Die Zofe Violets 
 Bogumil Miler as Lipp, ein Fischer 
 Loni Nest as Klein Archibald, Kind der Strehlens 
 Hans Rohde as Forsten

References

Bibliography
 Hardt, Ursula. From Caligari to California: Erich Pommer's life in the International Film Wars. Berghahn Books, 1996.

External links

1921 films
Films of the Weimar Republic
German silent feature films
German drama films
Films directed by Artur Holz
Films based on German novels
1921 drama films
Films produced by Erich Pommer
German black-and-white films
Silent drama films
1920s German films
1920s German-language films